Cham-e Eshag (also Romanized as Cham-e Esḩāg; also known as Cham-e Esḩāq and Sohāg) is a village in Abdoliyeh-ye Sharqi Rural District, in the Central District of Ramshir County, Khuzestan Province, Iran. In 2006, its population was 257, in 43 families.

References 

Populated places in Ramshir County